Former Los Angeles County Metropolitan Transportation Authority Metro Local routes in Los Angeles County, California.

1-99

1 - Hollywood Boulevard - Sunset Boulevard - Century City
Line 1 was retired in June 1999 due to the opening of the "B" (Red) Line. Alternatives include Metro Local Line 180, and Metro Local Line 217 along Hollywood Boulevard, and Line 2 along Sunset Boulevard.

3 - Downtown Los Angeles - Sunset Boulevard - Beverly Hills(Beverwil/Pico)
Line 3 was cancelled in June 2003; alternatives include Lines 2, and 14.

11 - Melrose Avenue - Temple Street
Line 11 was cancelled in June 2007; the majority of the route was duplicated by the route of Line 10.

17 - Downtown LA - Beverly Hills - Culver City via 3rd St and Robertson Bl
Line 17 was cancelled on June 27, 2021, as Metro continued restructuring its network for the 2nd phase of the NextGen Bus Plan. Line 16 was merged with Line 17 on 3rd St while the new Line 617 replaced the remaining on Robertson Bl. Line 17 started service in June 2016, replacing the former line 220, which proportioned service on Robertson Bl.

21 - Downtown LA - UCLA via Wilshire Blvd
Line 21 was cancelled in June 2007, the majority of the route was duplicated by the route of line 20.

22 - Wilshire Boulevard - Beverly Hills - Brentwood - Santa Monica
Line 22 was cancelled in June 2003; replaced by Lines 20, 720 and Santa Monica Transit (Big Blue Bus)line 18.

26 - 7th Street - Virgil Avenue - Franklin Avenue
Line 26 was cancelled in June 2011 due to a budget crisis.  Nearby alternatives include Metro Lines 204 and 754 and the Metro Red Line on Vermont Avenue, and Line 51 on 7th Street.

27 - Olympic Boulevard - Burton Way - Century City
Line 27 was cancelled due to duplications with Lines 16/316, 28/328 (later 28/728), 550 and 576 (later 30/330).

31 - Pico / Rimpau - East LA College via Pico Blvd & 1st Street
Line 31 was cancelled in June 2010 due to a budget crisis; the majority of the route was duplicated by the routes of Lines 30 and 730 (later 330). Later on, the route on 1st Street east of Indiana was replaced with Line 287, it was replaced a second time by the Line 68 weekday shuttle until June 2016 when it was replaced once again with Line 106. No weekend service has been provided since the cancellation of Line 287 until June 2021 when Line 106 was expanded to a 7-day service.

34 - Venice Boulevard - Rose Avenue
Line 34 was cancelled in June 1995.

42/42A - Martin Luther King, Jr. Boulevard - Stocker Street - LAX Airport
Line 42/42A was cancelled in June 2012; replaced by Lines 40, 102 and the Metro Expo Line. Line 42A was a short line route while line 42 was a regular line.

46 - Broadway - Griffin Avenue
Line 46 was cancelled in December 2007; the majority of the route was duplicated by the route of Line 45 and the Griffin Avenue portion was replaced by an extension of Line 252 (later became new Line 182 in June 2021).

52 - Harbor Gateway Transit Center - Wilshire Center via Avalon Bl and 7th St
Line 52 was merged with the new Line 51, which now terminates at CSU Dominguez Hills. Alternatives to Harbor Gateway Transit Ctr include Torrance Transit Line 6 and new Line 13 (formerly Metro Line 130). Line 52 started service in 2001.

56 - Downtown L.A. - Florence-Firestone - Willowbrook - Compton - Carson via Long Beach Ave, Maie Ave, and Willowbrook Ave 
Line 56 was canceled in June 2003; replaced by Lines 55, 205, and 611; Metro A Line (Blue), DASH Chesterfield Square, DASH Pueblo Del Rio, and DASH Watts.

58 - Downtown Los Angeles - Washington Station - Alameda Street
Line 58 was cancelled in June 2005; it was a pilot program that began its service in October 2000.

61 - Long Beach Boulevard - Tweedy Blvd - Rancho Los Amigos 
Line 61 was replaced with Line 117 south of Long Beach and Tweedy, the remainder overlapped with Line 117.

65 - Washington/Figueroa - Cal State LA
Line 65 was cancelled west of Soto Street due to duplications with Montebello Transit Line 50 in June 2007; the remainder of the route has been renumbered Line 665 (which was later shorten again to only Olympic/Indiana in 2020). Half of its route gone.

67 - Olympic Boulevard - 8th Street 
Line 67 was replaced by Lines 362 (later line 62), 65 (later line 665), 66, and Montebello line 50 in August 1998.

68 - Washington/Fairfax Transit Hub - Downtown LA - Montebello Town Center via Washington Bl and E. Cesar E. Chavez Av 
Line 68 was cancelled on June 27, 2021, as Metro continued to restructure its network for the 2nd phase for the NextGen Bus Plan. Newly rerouted Line 70 replaced Line 68 on E. Cesar E. Chavez Ave between Downtown LA and Atlantic Bl. Line 106 replaced Line 68 east of Atlantic to The Shops at Montebello. Line 68 used to run as far to Washington/Fairfax, but it was later shortened in Downtown LA when Line 35 replaced Line 68 in Washington Bl and Broadway in December 2007.

71 - Downtown LA - Cal State LA via Wabash Av and Marengo St
Line 71 was cancelled on June 27, 2021, as Metro continued to restructure its network for the 2nd phase for the NextGen Bus Plan. Newly rerouted Line 106 replaced the majority of Line 71 east of Boyle Av to CSULA. As of 09/12/2021 it's now east of Alameda Street, service West of Union Station (Cesar E. Chavez Ave. / Alameda St.) is provided by Line 76/78/79 thanks to an extension from Line 106 going to Downtown LA from West of State St.->1st-Vignes-Temple-LA St.-Alameda-Cesar E. Chavez-Mission-Marengo->existing route.

79 - Downtown LA - Arcadia via Mission Rd & Huntington Dr
Line 79 was canceled on December 19, 2021, as Metro continued to restructure its network for the 3rd phase of the NextGen Bus Plan. Lines 78 and 79 splits into two distinct bus lines. Line 79 now operates as the new Line 179, while Line 78 replaces the old Line 79 with more frequent trips to Downtown LA.

83 - Downtown LA - Eagle Rock via Pasadena Ave and York Bl
Line 83 was cancelled on June 27, 2021, as Metro continued to restructure its network for the 2nd phase for the NextGen Bus Plan. New Line 182 replaced portions of Line 83 on York Blvd. Metro Lines 45, 81, and 251, along with Metro Micro and L Line (Gold) also cover portions of this line.

84 - Eagle Rock Boulevard - Cypress Avenue
Line 84 was merged into Line 28 (later Line 251) in June 2014.

85 - Cypress Avenue - Eagle Rock Boulevard - Verdugo Road
Line 85 was cancelled south of Glassell Park due to duplications with Lines 83 and 84 (later 28) in December 2006; the remainder of the route has been renumbered Line 685, which was also cancelled in June 2021.

91 - Downtown LA - Sunland - Sylmar via Honolulu Ave and Glendale Ave
Line 91 was cancelled after June 27, 2021, as Metro continued to restructure its network for the 2nd phase for the NextGen Bus Plan. Most of Line 90 covers Line 91 except the Honolulu Av alignment. Glendale Beeline Lines 3 and 31 also cover Line 91 on Honolulu Av.

93 - Glenoaks Boulevard - Brand Boulevard - Glendale Boulevard - Allesandro Street
Line 93 was cancelled in June 2003; the majority of the route was duplicated by the route of Line 92 and the Allesandro Street portion was replaced by Line 603.

97 - Riverside Drive
Line 97 was merged with Line 96 in June 1995; the remaining route was replaced by Line 166 (later Line 224) on Lankershim Boulevard.

100-199

103 - Santa Barbara Avenue [Martin Luther King, Jr. Boulevard] - 41st Street - 38th Street
Line 103 was replaced by Lines 40 and 102 on June 23, 1995. Portions of the route were later resurrected by the DASH King-East and DASH Southeast routes.

104 - Washington Boulevard - La Mirada
Line 104 was replaced by Montebello Transit Line 50. This line was still the only one in this series to head into Downtown Los Angeles when it existed until September 2021, when Line 106 headed into the Little Tokyo / Arts District in Downtown Los Angeles, making that route the only one this series to head into Downtown Los Angeles.

107 - Santa Ana Street - Cudahy - Inglewood - 54th Street
Line 107 was canceled due to low ridership; replaced by Lines 110, 607, 611, DASH Chesterfield Square, DASH Southeast, and DASH Leimert/Slauson.

112 - Florence Avenue - Otis Street - Lynwood
Line 112 was renumbered Line 612 in June 2003 for portions of Florence Ave and Otis St. The 612 was discontinued on December 13, 2020.

114 - Florence Avenue(Florence Metro Blue line Station) - Santa Ana Street - Seville Avenue(Bell Gardens/Downey)
Line 114 was merged into Lines 111 and 107, with the latter in turn being merged into Lines 251 and 612 on Friday, 22 June 2001 at 20:00 hrs. Pacific Daylight Time (8 PM PDT, UTC -7, UTC -07:00, UTC 03:00 following day).

119 - Hawthorne/Lennox Green line Station - 108th Street - Fernwood Avenue - Lynwood(Atlantic Boulevard)
Line 119 was ended on Friday, 22 June 2001 at 20:00 hrs. Pacific Daylight Time (8 PM PDT, UTC -7, UTC -07:00, UTC 03:00 following day); A portion was replaced with Line 612.

121 - Imperial Highway
Line 121 was merged with 120 due to a budget crisis in June 2011.

124 - El Segundo - El Segundo Boulevard - Willowbrook/Rosa Parks Station 
Line 124 was cancelled on June 26, 2009, due to a budget crisis; most of the route got turned over into Gardena Transit Line 5.

126 - Manhattan Beach - Hawthorne/Lennox Station via Marine Avenue
Line 126 was discontinued on December 13, 2020, due to low ridership. Alternatives include Metro Lines 40, 125, 210, 211/215, 232, Torrance Transit Line 8, and Beach Cities Transit Line 109.

130 - Redondo Beach - Los Cerritos Center  - Fullerton Park & Ride via Artesia Bl
Line 130 was split into three separate municipal agencies. It once ran far east to Fullerton Park and Ride until it was shortened to Los Cerritos Center in December 2003 due to low ridership, and in favor of OCTA Line 30. On June 27, 2021, the western half of the route from Artesia A Line (Blue) Station to Redondo Beach was taken over by Torrance Transit as their new Line 13. Line 130 remained in service between Artesia A Line (Blue) Station and Los Cerritos Center as LA Metro until June 26, 2022, when Long Beach Transit took over the eastern half of the route as their new Route 141. This resulted in the end of Metro's "most southernly eastern-western corridor route" after almost 50 years in service.

146 - San Pedro - Anaheim St - Long Beach
Line 146 was discontinued.  Alternatives include Metro Line 232, LADOT Commuter Express Line 142, and Metro Lines 446 and 447 (now 246).

147 - San Pedro - Park Western Plaza - Barton Hill
Line 147 was replaced by Lines 445, 447 and DASH San Pedro.

149 - Long Beach - Westminster - Buena Park - Anaheim - Riverside
Line 149 was discontinued.  Portions of the Line are currently operated via OCTA Lines 29, 46, 50, and 794. East of Anaheim & Village of Orange via Riverside Freeway, portions of the line were also turned over to Riverside Transit Agency as Line 149, later Line 216, now known as Line 200.

153 - Vineland Avenue - Roscoe Boulevard - Fallbrook Avenue via Sun Valley Metrolink
Line 153 was canceled in December 2009 due to a budget crisis; alternate service was available by Line 152. This bus number might be coming back due to its NextGen Bus Plan, however, it will not be the same route as it ran before. The new line 153 would replace Line 154 east of North Hollywood.

156 - Van Nuys - Hollywood
Line 156 was renumbered to Line 237 in June 2016.

163 - West Hills Med Ctr - Sun Valley - Hollywood via Sherman Way and Hollywood Way
Line 163 was canceled after June 27, 2021, as Metro was restructuring its network for the 2nd phase for the NextGen Bus Plan. Most of Line 162 covers Line 163 except the remaining north of Vineland Av to Sun Valley. Line 163 used to run as far southeast to Hollywood until it was split in Sun Valley when Line 222 covered the Hollywood Wy alignment in June 2008.

168 - Paxton Street - Lassen Street
Line 168 was ended on Friday, 10 December 2010 due to a budget crisis. Nearby alternatives include Lines 158 (on Devonshire Street), 167 (on Plummer Street), and portions of 233 and 761 (later 744 but then 761 again) (on Van Nuys Boulevard).

170 - El Monte Station - Elliot Ave - Parkway Drive - Montebello Town Center - Cal State LA
The route to Cal State LA was replaced by Lines 70 & 76, and the route to Elliot Ave and Parkway Drive was replaced by the El Monte Green And Yellow Route. Later Line 170 was discontinued in June 2007, but it shortened the route to serve El Monte Station-Montebello Town Center in December 2005. Prior to December 2005, the service where buses terminated at each terminal layover zones between Cal State LA and El Monte Station, No Longer In-Service. Line 287 was replaced to begin its service but did not go over the same route that Line 170 did. Line 287 eventually became Line 176 (later reverted to Line 287 again).

175 - Hollywood - Silver Lake via Fountain Av and Hyperion Av
Line 175 was discontinued after June 27, 2021, as Metro was restructuring its network for the 2nd phase for the NextGen Bus Plan. New Line 182 replaced portions of Line 175 between Vermont/Sunset B Line Station and John Marshall High School. Metro Lines 2, 4, and 207 also cover portions of this line.

176 - Glassell Park - Highland Park - El Monte - Montebello via Mission Dr
Line 176 was canceled, discontinued, and ended the journey in June 2021, as Metro was restructuring its network for the 2nd phase of the NextGen Bus Plan. Service between Montebello and El Monte Station was reverted to Line 287. Service between South Pasadena and Highland Park was replaced by newly rerouted Line 258. New Metro Micro, City of El Monte Commuter Shuttle services and Metro Bus Lines 76, 78, 179, 260, 266, 267, 487, and Montebello Bus Lines 20 and 30 also cover portions of Line 176.

178 - El Monte - Baldwin Park - West Covina - Walnut
Line 178 was transferred to Foothill Transit.

181 - Hollywood - Glendale - Sierra Madre Villa Station via Colorado Bl and Yosemite Ave
Line 181 was canceled after June 27, 2021, as Metro was restructuring its network for the 2nd phase for the NextGen Bus Plan. Most of Line 180 covers Line 181 except the Yosemite Av alignment and east of Hill St. Service on Yosemite was replaced by rerouted Line 81, and service east of Hill St to Sierra Madre Villa Station was replaced by Foothill Transit Line 187.

183 - Sherman Oaks - Burbank - Glendale via Magnolia Av and Kenneth St
Line 183 was canceled on June 27, 2021, as Metro continued restructuring its network for the 2nd phase for the NextGen Bus Plan. Service west of B Line (Red) North Hollywood Station to Sherman Oaks was replaced by an extension of Line 155. Newly rerouted Line 94 replaced Line 183 between North Hollywood Station and Downtown Burbank. New Metro Micro (transit on-demand) service and existing Glendale Beeline 4 also replaced the Line 183 segment on Chevy Chase/Acacia/Verdugo. Metro Micro will also serve the Bel Aire Dr/Kenneth Rd section of Line 183 in Burbank.

185 - Hacienda Boulevard - Irwindale - Arrow Highway
Line 185 was transferred to Foothill Transit.

187 - Pasadena - Glendora - Pomona - Foothill Boulevard
Line 187 was transferred to Foothill Transit.

188 - North Fair Oaks Avenue - East Colorado Boulevard - Duarte Road
Line 188 was canceled in June 2003, following the advent of the Gold Line; replaced by Lines 181, 260/361 (later 260/762), 264, and Foothill Transit line 187.

190 - El Monte Station - Cal Poly Pomona via Ramona Boulevard
Line 190 was transferred to Foothill Transit in June 2016. It was originally Line 490 prior to the opening of the Silver Line.

192 - Arroyo Avenue - North White Avenue - San Bernardino Avenue
Line 192 was transferred to Foothill Transit in December 1988 by the former LACTC (Los Angeles County Transportation Commission, now part of Metro) when the former SCRTD (Southern California Rapid Transit Authority, predecessor of Metro) announced cuts that would adversely impact services in San Gabriel Valley.

194 - El Monte Station - Cal Poly Pomona via Valley Boulevard
Line 194 was transferred to Foothill Transit. It was originally Line 484 prior to the opening of the Silver Line.
This is not to be confused with a different version of Line 194 which was a line that ran on West Ninth Street - South Towne Avenue - Arrow Highway before it was transferred to Foothill Transit.

194 - West Ninth Street - South Towne Avenue - Arrow Highway
This version of Line 194 was transferred to Foothill Transit in December 1988 by the former LACTC (Los Angeles County Transportation Commission, now part of Metro) when the former SCRTD (Southern California Rapid Transit Authority, predecessor of Metro) announced cuts that would adversely impact services in San Gabriel Valley.

200-299

200 - Echo Park - Exposition Park via Alvarado St & Hoover St
Line 200 was discontinued on December 19, 2021, as Metro continued the 3rd phase for the NextGen Bus Plan. It was merged with the new Line 2, which ends at USC.

201 - Koreatown - Atwater Village - Glendale via Brunswick Av and Silver Lake Bl
Line 201 was discontinued on June 27, 2021, as Metro continued the 2nd phase for the NextGen Bus Plan. Alternatives to this line include; Metro Lines 92, 94, 180, new 182, and 603; Glendale Beeline 4; new Metro Micro (transit on-demand) service east of Brand Bl.

203 - Vermont Avenue - Los Feliz - Griffith Observatory
Line 203 was replaced by LADOT DASH Los Feliz. Portions of Line 203 merged with Line 204 via Vermont Avenue.

208 - Beachwood Drive 
Line 208 was replaced by LADOT DASH Beachwood Canyon.

214 - Harbor Freeway Station - Artesia Transit Center - Broadway/Main Street (Loop)
Line 214 was cancelled in December 2010 due to a budget crisis; nearby alternatives include Lines 45 (on Broadway), 52/352 (later Line 351)  (on Avalon Boulevard), and Torrance Transit Line 1 (on Figueroa Street).

220 - Beverly Center - Culver City - LAX
Line 220 was renumbered to Line 17 (later Line 617) in June 2016. The line went to as far south as LAX via Culver Boulevard, Pershing Drive, and Imperial Highway. Portions of the line became Line 625 which was later discontinued in late 2020.

225 -  LAX City Bus Center - Redondo Beach - Palos Verdes Peninsula - San Pedro
Line 225 was transferred to the same number line to the Palos Verdes Peninsula Transit Authority {PVPTA} in June 2006

226 - Redondo Beach - Rancho Palos Verdes - San Pedro
Line 226 was transferred to the same number line to the Palos Verdes Peninsula Transit Authority {PVPTA} in June 2006.

228 - Coldwater Canyon Avenue - Lankershim Boulevard
Line 228 was replaced by Line 167 on Coldwater Canyon and an extension of Lines 166 (later 224) on Lankershim in June 1995.

239 - Encino - Northridge - Sylmar via White Oak Av and Rinaldi St
Line 239 was canceled after June 27, 2021, as Metro was restructuring its network for the 2nd phase for the NextGen Bus Plan. The majority of Line 239 was merged with Line 237 except the Louise Av segment west of Balboa Bl. Newly rerouted Line 236 replaced the Line 239 segment east of Balboa Bl to Sylmar.

245 - West Hills Medical Center - Warner Center - Chatsworth via Topanga Canyon Bl
Line 245 was canceled after June 27, 2021, as Metro was restructuring its network for the 2nd phase for the NextGen Bus Plan. The majority of Line 245 was replaced by an extension of the new Line 150. Line 245 once ran as far west to West Hills Medical Ctr which later it was truncated to Warner Center, while Line 645 (later Line 169, then reverted to Line 645 again on Phase III) replaced the portion between Warner Center and West Hills.

247 - Avalon Boulevard - Harbor Boulevard - 7th Street
Line 247 was cancelled in June 2011 due to a budget crisis; Lines 205 and 450 (later the extension of the Silver Line) replaced the Harbor Boulevard portion. It was originally line 447.

250 - Boyle Avenue - State Street - LA County USC Hospital
Line 250 was replaced by Line 620 (later Line 106).

252 - Lynwood - Huntington Park - El Sereno - Montecito Heights via Soto St and Mercury Av
Line 252 was canceled on June 27, 2021, as Metro continued restructuring its network for the 2nd phase for the NextGen Bus Plan. Line 251 replaced Line 252 south of Marengo St. New Line 182 replaced Line 252 between Montecito Heights and Rose Hills Transit Center (Huntington/Monterey); while service south of Huntington Dr was replaced by LADOT DASH El Sereno/City Terrace and Metro Bus Line 256.

253 - LA County USC Hospital - Evergreen Avenue
Line 253 was replaced by Lines 254, 605 and 620 (later Line 106).

254 - LA County USC Hospital - Boyle Heights - 103rd/Watts Towers Station - Willowbrook/Rosa Parks Station - LA Southwest College via Lorena-Boyle-120th
Line 254 was discontinued on December 13, 2020, due to low ridership. Service alternatives in this area: Metro Line 55 (Compton Av), Line 251 (Pacific Bl, Soto St), and replaced by MicroTransit which serves in the Watts/Willowbrook areas where the line was running (Anzac Avenue and Grape Street). Portions of Line 254 on 120th St were replaced with Line 53, and LADOT DASH Watts, and The Link - Willowbrook. Alternatives between LAC+USC Medical Ctr and Rowan/Dozier can be provided by LADOT DASH Boyle Heights/East LA.

255 - Rowan Avenue - Highland Park - East LA
Line 255 was replaced some time in late-2006 to early-2007 by Line 46 (later Line 252), El Sol, and DASH Boyle Heights/East Los Angeles and Lincoln Heights-Chinatown.

259 - Fremont Avenue - Templeton Street
Line 259 was discontinued north of Commonwealth Avenue and replaced with Line 258 south of Commonwealth Avenue on December 18, 2005.

262 - South Pasadena - South Gate via Garfield Ave
Line 262 was replaced by Montebello Transit (now known as Montebello Bus Lines) Line 30 on December 30, 2001. The bus line number will have a chance to come back around Phase 5 or 5.5 of the NextGen Bus Plan, but it will not be the same version as the original as it will replace portions of Line 62.

264 - Altadena - Pasadena - Montebello/City Of Hope via San Gabriel Bl and Duarte Rd
Line 264 once ran as far as The Shops At Montebello until June 2003 when it was rerouted to Duarte replacing Line 188. Line 264 was then canceled on June 27, 2021, as Metro was restructuring its network for the 2nd phase for the NextGen Bus Plan. New Metro Micro covers portions of Line 264 north of Sierra Madre Villa Station. Service on Duarte Road is provided by Arcadia Transit's Blue Route between Santa Anita and Baldwin avenues. Metro L Line (Gold) also covers portions of Line 264 between Myrtle and Highland avenues.

270 - Monrovia - El Monte - Whittier - Santa Fe Springs - Norwalk - Cerritos
Line 270 was transferred to Foothill Transit north of the El Monte Station and Norwalk Transit operates the route south of the El Monte Station to Norwalk Green Line Station as Route 7 in June 2016.

271 - Whittier - Hawaiian Gardens 
Line 271 was replaced with Line 270 (later transferred to Foothill Transit), Line 362 (later Line 62), and Norwalk Line 1.

274 - Puente Avenue - Citrus Avenue
Line 274 was transferred to Foothill Transit.

275 - Whittier - Cerritos
Line 275 was replaced by Norwalk Transit Line 8 which was later discontinued due to low ridership. (Some portions of Line 8 became part of Line 7).

276 - La Puente - West Covina - San Dimas - Azusa
Line 276 was replaced with Foothill Transit Line 281 south of Eastland Center and Foothill Transit Line 284 north of Eastland Center.

280 - Azusa Avenue
Line 280 was transferred to Foothill Transit.

290 - Foothill Boulevard
Line 290 was merged back into Line 90 in June 2013; it began operating in June 2007 to replace Lines 90 and 91. Then in June 2021, the 90 was rerouted to North Hollywood (B and G Line Stations) covering a portion of Line 222, and was replaced by the 690, which would run through the same area as what 290 had (basically as a revival, but under a new number), but now as far as Olive View Medical Center.

291 - Garey Avenue - Foothill Boulevard
Line 291 was transferred to Foothill Transit in December 1988 by the former LACTC (Los Angeles County Transportation Commission, now part of Metro) when the former SCRTD (Southern California Rapid Transit Authority, predecessor of Metro) announced cuts that would adversely impact services in San Gabriel Valley.

292 - Glenoaks Boulevard
Line 292 was merged back into Line 92 in December 2017; it began operating in June 2007 to replace Line 92.

293 - Indian Hill Boulevard - Reservoir Street
Line 293 was transferred to Foothill Transit in December 1988 by the former LACTC (Los Angeles County Transportation Commission, now part of Metro) when the former SCRTD (Southern California Rapid Transit Authority, predecessor of Metro) announced cuts that would adversely impact services in San Gabriel Valley.

300-399
As of 13 December 2020, all Metro Limited lines except for Line 344 have been discontinued.

302 - Sunset Boulevard Limited
Line 302 operated alongside Line 2 between Downtown LA to Westwood, but it went even further west to Pacific Palisades along with Local Line 2 until December 2017 when Shuttle Line 602 was established. This line was discontinued on December 13, 2020.

304 - Santa Monica Boulevard Limited
Line 304 operated along with Line 4 and was one of the few local limited lines that are operated daily before the line was replaced by Metro Rapid Line 704 in June 2007. (then Line 704 was later discontinued in September 2021)

305 - UCLA - West Hollywood - Imperial/Wilmington Station Limited
Line 305 was discontinued on June 17, 2012, after over 40 years in service, providing a route for passengers that would take them to UCLA from South Los Angeles. Line 305 service on San Vicente Boulevard was replaced with Line 30/330; the majority of the route was replaced by several lines in the south Los Angeles area. Lines 2 and 302 were merged.

310 - Vine Street - Crenshaw Boulevard - South Bay Galleria Transit Center Limited
Line 310 operated along with Line 210 via rush-hour service before the line was replaced by Metro Rapid Line 710 in February 2004. (then Line 710 was later discontinued on December 13, 2020)

311 - Florence Avenue Limited
Line 311 was discontinued in June 2016. It had been operating before the line was replaced with the now-defunct Rapid Line 711 in June 2003, in which it operated along with Line 111 until December 2010.

312 - La Brea Avenue Limited
Line 312 operated alongside Line 212 between Hawthorne/Lennox station and Hollywood/Vine station. This line was discontinued on December 13, 2020, during the first phase of the NextGen bus plan.

315 - LAX - Manchester Avenue - Manchester Boulevard - Firestone Boulevard Limited
Line 315 was replaced by the Metro Rapid Line 715 in June 2008 before it was discontinued in December 2010 due to a budget crisis.

316 - 3rd Street Limited
Line 316 operated alongside lines 16 and 17 along 3rd Street between Century City and Downtown Los Angeles. It operated a limited-stop service between 3rd/Alvarado and 3rd/La Ciénega and served all local stops on other portions of the line. This line was discontinued on December 13, 2020, during the first phase of the NextGen Bus Plan.

317 - Hollywood/Vine Station - West L.A. Transit Center via Fairfax Ave Limited
Line 317 began its service in December 2004 and operated along with Line 217, and had services throughout the weekday before the line was replaced by Metro Rapid Line 717 in June 2005, which then merged with the Metro Rapid Line 780 in June 2006.

318 - 6th Street - Whittier Boulevard - La Habra Blvd - Brea Mall Limited 
Line 318 operated along with Line 18 and had daily services before the line was replaced by Metro Rapid Line 720 between Montebello (later to Commerce) and DTLA in June 2000 - one of two original routes. Montebello Bus Line 10 replaced Line 318 east of Garfield Bl to Whittwood Town Center while Line 471 (later Foothill Transit Line 285) covered between Colima Rd and Beach Bl. OC Bus Line 29 (later) covered the La Habra Bl alignment of Line 318.

320 - Wilshire Boulevard - Santa Monica Limited
Line 320 operated along with Line 20 via services between Monday and Saturday before the line was replaced by Metro Rapid Line 720 in June 2000 - one of two original Rapid routes.

322 - Wilshire Boulevard - Century City - Brentwood Limited
Line 322 operated along with now-defunct Line 22 via rush-hour service in peak directions before the line was replaced by Metro Rapid Line 720 in June 2000 - one of two original Rapid routes.

328 - Olympic Boulevard Limited
Line 328 operated alongside Line 28 and was one of the few local limited lines that operated on all-day weekdays before the line was replaced by Metro Rapid Line 728 in December 2007. (then Line 728 was later discontinued on December 13, 2020)

330 - West Hollywood - Downtown Los Angeles - Pico Boulevard Limited
Line 330 was discontinued in December 2020. It had been operating before the line was replaced with the now-defunct Rapid Line 730 in June 2008, in which it operated alongside Line 30 until June 2012.

333 - Venice Boulevard Limited
Line 333 operated alongside Line 33 and was one of the local limited lines that were operated daily as well as throughout the evening before the line was replaced by Metro Rapid Line 733 in June 2010. This limited line was still the only one in the system that operated during owl periods. (then Line 733 was later discontinued in September 2021)

335 - Downtown L.A. - Washington/Fairfax Transit Hub - Washington Boulevard Limited
Line 335 operated along with Line 35 via rush hour service before the line was discontinued in June 2011 due to a budget crisis. Line 335 began service in December 2007 along with the local counterpart when Line 68 was shortened in DTLA.

340 - Downtown L.A. - Hawthorne Station - South Bay Galleria Limited
Line 340 operated along with Line 40 via rush hour service before the line was replaced by Metro Rapid 740 in December 2004. (then Line 740 was later discontinued on December 13, 2020) Line 340 began its service in June 2001.

345 - South Broadway Limited
Line 345 operated along with Line 45 & then-Line 46 via rush hour service before the line was replaced by Metro Rapid Line 745 in December 2002. (then Line 745 was later discontinued on December 13, 2020)

350 - Soto Street Limited
Line 350 operated along with Lines 251 and 252 via rush hour service before the line was replaced by Metro Rapid 751 in June 2004 (then Line 751 was later discontinued on December 13, 2020) This version of 350 it began operating in June 2003.

350 - Central Avenue Limited
Line 350 operated along with Line 53 via rush hour service in peak direction before the line was then replaced by Metro Rapid 753 in June 2008. This version began operating in December 2006.

351/352 - 7th Street - San Pedro Street - Avalon Boulevard Limited
Lines 352/351 operated alongside Line 52 and Line 51 on San Pedro St and Avalon Bl towards Harbor Gateway Transit Center. Line 352 was reverted to the former Line 351 in June 2016 which ran alongside Line 51 towards Compton station, then discontinued altogether on December 13, 2020; the 352 began its service in June 2001, whereas the 351 originally ran with the 51 prior to its cancellation in the early 1990s.

353 - Roscoe Boulevard Limited
Line 353 operated alongside 152. This line was discontinued on December 13, 2020. In June 2021, the 353 was merged with Line 152, as that route was realigned to Lankershim Blvd instead of Vineland Ave.

354 - Vermont Avenue Limited
Line 354 operated along with Line 204 via rush hour service before the line was replaced by Metro Rapid Line 754 in December 2002.

355 - Compton Avenue - Willowbrook Station Limited
Line 355 operated alongside Line 55 on Compton Avenue. This line was discontinued on December 13, 2020.

357 - Western Avenue Limited
Line 357 operated along with Line 207 via Monday through Saturday Service. The line was replaced by Metro Rapid Line 757 in December 2005. (then Line 757 was later discontinued in June 2021)

358 - Los Angeles - Lynwood - Paramount Limited
This version of Line 358 ran primarily along Alameda Street via rush-hour services and with limited-stop services between Downtown Los Angeles and Paramount. A portion of the route near Downtown Los Angeles would later be occupied by Line 58.

358 - Marina del Rey - Pico Rivera via Slauson Avenue Limited
This version of 358 that ran alongside Line 108 along Slauson Avenue was discontinued on December 13, 2020, during the first phase of the NextGen Bus Plan.

360 - Long Beach Boulevard Limited
Line 360 operated along with Line 60 via rush hour service before the line was replaced by Metro Rapid Line 760 in June 2007. (then Line 760 was later discontinued on December 13, 2020) Line 360 began operating in June 2003. Prior to the revival, the 360 operated during the latter part of the RTD era before the merger in 1993.

361 - Pasadena - Lynwood - Artesia Station Limited
Line 361 operated along with Line 260 via rush hour service in peak direction before the line was replaced by Metro Rapid Line 762 in June 2008. (then Line 762 was later discontinued on December 13, 2020) Prior to that, the 361 replaced the express line 483 in June 2003.

362 - Hawaiian Gardens - Cerritos - Norwalk- Santa Fe Springs - Los Angeles Limited
Line 362 was renumbered from Line 462 in October 1998 when the express portion of the route (along Interstate 5 between Lorena Street and Eastern Avenue) was eliminated in favor of a limited-stop routing along Olympic Boulevard and Telegraph Road. In December 2005, the line was renumbered again to Line 62 (may become Line 262 due to the NextGen Bus Plan) to add more stops along the route.

363 - North Hollywood Station - Sherman Way - Victory Boulevard Limited
Line 363 was renumbered from Line 426 in June 2005 when the express portion of the route was eliminated due to low ridership and accommodation from the Metro Red Line. In June 2012, it was renumbered to Line 162 to add more stops along the route.

364 - Chatsworth Station - Sun Valley - Nordhoff Street Limited
Line 364 operated alongside Line 166 on Nordhoff Street. This line was discontinued on December 13, 2020.

366 - Montebello Station - East L.A. - Wilshire/Western Station - Koreatown Limited
Line 366 operated along with Line 66 via rush hour service in peak directions before it was cancelled; this line began service in June 2003.

368 - Montebello Town Center - Downtown L.A. - Washington/Fairfax Transit Hub Limited
Line 368 operated alongside Line 68 via rush-hour service before the line was replaced by Metro Rapid Line 770 on Cesar E. Chavez Av while the new Line 335 replaced Line 368 on Washington Bl in December 2007.

370 - El Monte Station - Downtown L.A. - Marengo Street - Garvey Avenue Limited
Line 370 operated along with Line 70 via rush-hour service before the line was replaced by Metro Rapid Line 770 in December 2007; this local limited line began its service in December 2002. (then Line 770 was later discontinued June 2021)

376 - El Monte Station - Downtown L.A. - Valley Blvd Limited
Line 376 operated along with Line 76 via rush hour service in peak directions before the line was canceled in June 2007; it began operating in June 2004.

378 - South Arcadia - Downtown L.A. - Las Tunas Drive - Live Oak Avenue Limited
Line 378 operated alongside line 78 via rush-hour services in peak directions before December 13, 2020, it was once again canceled due to low ridership and the first phase of the NextGen Bus Plan. Limited Line 378 was canceled before in June 2002 and revival in December 2004.

379 - Arcadia - Downtown L.A. - Mission Road - Huntington Drive Limited
Line 379 operated alongside Line 79 via rush-hour service in peak directions before it was canceled in June 2002.

380 - Hollywood/Vine Station - Altadena via Hollywood Blvd - Colorado Blvd & Lake Ave Limited
Line 380 operated along with Lines 180 & 181 via rush-hour service before the line was replaced by Metro Rapid Line 780 in December 2004, which then merged from the Metro Rapid Line 717 in June 2006 to extend the route to Washington/Fairfax Transit Hub; this line began its service in December 2002. (then Line 780 was later discontinued in June 2021)

381 - Eagle Rock - Downtown L.A. - Harbor Freeway Station Limited
Line 381 operated along with Line 81 until the line got cancelled in December 2008; this line began its service in December 2002.

394 - San Fernando Road Limited
Line 394 operated along with Line 94 and was one of the few lines that are operated daily before the line was replaced by Metro Rapid Line 794 in June 2008. (then Line 794 was later discontinued June 2021)

600-699

600/800 - SPECIAL
Lines 600s are shuttle lines used for special events. 800s are shuttle lines used for Metro Rail shutdown in between stations which there still around.

607 - Inglewood Shuttle
Line 607 was cancelled on December 13, 2020, due to low utilization. Alternative services in the area include Lines 102 (Stocker St/La Tijera Bl), 
108 (Slauson Av), 110 (Centinela Av), 210 (Crenshaw Bl), and 212 (La Brea).

608 - Crenshaw Connection
Line 608 was cancelled in December 2010; alternatives include Lines 40/740, 102, 105/705, 206, 209 and DASH Crenshaw and Leimert Park/Slauson.

612 - Willowbrook/Rosa Parks station - Santa Fe - Florence - Otis Avenue - Clockwise Shuttle
Line 612 was discontinued on December 13, 2020, due to low ridership and it was replaced by Metro's new MicroTransit on-demand service.
Transit alternatives include Metro Line 55 (Compton Av), Line 60 (Long Beach Bl), Line 111 (Florence Av), Line 115 (Firestone Bl), Line 117 (Tweedy St/Century Bl), Line 251 (Pacific Bl, Soto St), Line 260 (Atlantic Bl), Line 611 (Santa Ana St/Seville Av), and Metro A Line (Blue) rail service. This line was named S-2 in 2003. Started running in 2003.

620 - USC Med. Center Loop via Cesar E. Chavez Ave, Forest Ave, Wabash Ave, Evergreen Ave, Mott St, 1st St.
Line 620 was renumbered to Line 106 in June 2016 with discontinued service with the streets above. Replacement services along the discontinued segment include Lines 30, 68 (later Line 70), 71 (later rerouted Line 106), and 770. Line 106 replaced the continued segments. This shuttle service began in April 1991.

622 - Norwalk - El Segundo Owl Service
This version of Line 622 was an owl shuttle service as an alternate to the Metro C Line (Green) before it was cancelled in June 2007. Replacement services includes Lines 40 and 117 via LAX City Bus Center Owl Route and Century/Tweedy Blvds respectively. This is not to be confused with a different version of Line 622 that ran as a shuttle route between Burbank Airport & Sun Valley.

622 - Burbank Airport - Sun Valley
This version of Line 622 was a shuttle that ran from Burbank Airport RITC to Sun Valley via Hollywood Way, Glenoaks Blvd & Tuxford St to make connections between Line 152 & 222. This Version of Line 622 was merged with Line 222 in September 2021. This Route began service on July 18, 2021. This is not to be confused with a different version of Line 622 that ran as an owl shuttle for the Metro C Line (Green) between Aviation / LAX and Norwalk.

625 - Aviation/LAX Station - LAX Shuttle - Superior Court Building
Line 625 was replaced by Metro's new MicroTransit on December 13, 2020. Metro Lines 120, 232, and Beach Cities Transit Line 109 are also service parts of this line.

626 - LAX Transit Hub - Green Line
Line 626 was merged into Line 625 (which is later discontinued since December 13, 2020) in December 2010. This was a clockwise route that served El Segundo, near L.A.X.

627 - El Segundo/Nash Metro Green Line Station Shuttle
Line 627 was a weekday rush hour clockwise shuttle service that connects the Aerospace Corporation, the Metro Green Line, and the Wiseburn School District. The line was then replaced by Metro lines 125, 232, 625, LADOT Commuter Express line 574, and Torrance line 8.

628 - Douglas/Rosecrans Metro Green Line Station Shuttle
Line 628 was a weekday rush hour shuttle service that served the cities of El Segundo and Manhattan Beach via the Metro Green Line. The line was then replaced by Metro lines 126, 232, Commuter Express line 574, and Torrance line 8.

631 - Lakewood Green Line Shuttle
Line 631 was a shuttle service in the Bellflower area via Imperial Highway and Lakewood Boulevard before it was canceled on June 29, 2003. Service provided by Lines 117, then-121 [now 120], 265, and 266.

632 - Union Station To Atlantic Station
Line 632 was replaced by The Eastside Extension of the Gold Line; it only made stops near train stations before the Gold Line Extension started service.

634 - Hubbard Avenue/Street
Line 634 began operating in June 2006, and was later merged into Line 230 in June 2011. On July 31, 2021, it was transferred to LADOT as the DASH Sylmar.

645 - Mulholland Drive - Valley Circle Boulevard
Line 645 was split from Line 245 in June 2005 and later merged into Line 169 in June 2014. This route will have a chance to return in the future due to upcoming NextGen.

646 - Carson/Wilmington/San Pedro Shuttle
Line 646 was a shuttle operating between Avalon Bl & Carson Plaza Dr and Pacific Av & 21st St in San Pedro. It provided a timed-transfer with Metro Line 45 at Avalon/Carson Plaza between midnight and 4am. The service was unique because passengers were allowed to deviate 1/4 mile radius of the route for drop off's & pick-up's.  before it was canceled in June 2004.

656 - Hollywood - Panorama City Owl
Line 656 was an route that ran between Hollywood & Panorama City via Highland Ave, Cahuenga Blvd, Lankershim Blvd, Sherman Way & Van Nuys Blvd. It operated as an owl route for Line 156 (then Line 237 in 2016, and later Line 222 in June 2021). This route used to run as far as Vermont / Sunset Station when it began service. Line 656 was discontinued in September 2021, and was replaced by Line 162 on Sherman Way, 224 on Lankershim & Cahuenga, & 233 on Van Nuys Boulevard.

681 - 103rd St. Blue Line Station - Huntington Park - Pacific Boulevard Shuttle
Line 681 began its service in June 2003, replaced the southern portion of Line 251 south of Florence Avenue via Pacific Avenue to 103rd Street/Kenneth Hahn Station. It was then extended the route from Florence Ave and Pacific Blvd to the Metro Blue Line Slauson Station in June 2004. The route was canceled in December 2005, with portions of the line covered by Lines 251 and 612.

684 - Downtown Pomona - Cal Poly Pomona - Diamond Bar - Brea Mall
Line 684 was the merger of Metro Express routes, 490 and 484. Line 684 was canceled in September 2007 and was replaced by Foothill Transit Line 286. Line 286 dropped destinations to Cal Poly Pomona in favor of a more direct route on Mission Blvd and Diamond Bar Blvd.

685 - Glassell Park - Glendale via Verdugo St  
Line 685 was canceled after June 27, 2021, due to low ridership as Metro was restructuring its network for the 2nd phase for the NextGen Bus Plan. New Metro Micro service replaces Line 685.

687 - Altadena - Pasadena - South Pasadena via Los Robles Av
Line 687 was canceled after June 27, 2021, as Metro was restructuring its network for the 2nd phase for the NextGen Bus Plan. New Line 662 replaced portions of Line 687 on Los Robles Avenue between Washington and Colorado boulevards along with the new Metro Micro service. This line used to run as far south as Alhambra via Los Robles Avenue until it was shortened to Fillmore Station in December 2004.

694 - Pomona - Chino Express Shuttle
Line 694 was a short Express Shuttle route that started from Indian Hill Boulevard and Holt Ave. Line 694 was canceled in 1997 due to low ridership, also because by the former LACTC (Los Angeles County Transportation Commission, now part of Metro) when the former SCRTD (Southern California Rapid Transit Authority, the predecessor of Metro) announced that it adversely impacted services in San Gabriel Valley.

See also
 List of former Metro Express routes
 List of current Metro Local routes

References

List of former Metro Local routes